Philautus refugii is a species of frog in the family Rhacophoridae.
It is found in Malaysia and possibly Indonesia.
Its natural habitat is subtropical or tropical moist lowland forests.

References

refugii
Amphibians described in 1996
Taxonomy articles created by Polbot